Salutaguse may refer to several places in Estonia:

Salutaguse, Järva County, village in Koeru Parish, Järva County
Salutaguse, Lääne-Viru County, village in Laekvere Parish, Lääne-Viru County
Salutaguse, Rapla County, village in Kohila Parish, Rapla County